Buc may refer to:
 Buc, Yvelines, a municipality in the Yvelines department, France
 Buc, Territoire de Belfort, a municipality in the Territoire de Belfort department, France
 Búč, a village in south Slovakia
 buc, the ISO 639-3 code for the Bushi language
 Buc, a nickname for the Bucciali, a French 1920s automobile

The abbreviation BUC may refer to:
 Burketown Airport
 Barcelona Universitari Club, a rugby club based in Barcelona
 BUC (rugby league team), a Catalonia rugby league team
 Bulgarian Air Charter, a charter airline based in Sofia, Bulgaria
 Block upconverter, a device used in the transmission of satellite signals
 Bergen University College, a higher education institute in Bergen, Norway
 Bàng-uâ-cê, the Foochow Romanized writing system of Fuzhou Mindong Chinese
 Beirut University College, old name for the Lebanese American University
 Badr University in Cairo, a private university in Egypt
 Business Use Case, a use case in software and systems engineering